The Peel Session is a Bolt Thrower EP of their first Peel Sessions. It is released on Strange Fruit. It is produced by Dale Griffin. The EP is in its entirety included in The Peel Sessions 1988-90 (1991).

Track listing

Personnel
 Alan West - vocals
 Gavin Ward - guitars
 Barry Thomson - guitars
 Andrew Whale - drums
 Jo Bench - Bass

Bolt Thrower albums
Peel Sessions recordings
1988 EPs
Live EPs
1988 live albums